Oberea schaumii is a species of beetle in the family Cerambycidae. It was described by John Eatton Le Conte in 1852. It is known from Canada.

References

Beetles described in 1852
schaumii